This is an alphabetical list of songs written or co-written by the American songwriter Kostas that have been commercially released. According to BMI, he has written or co-written over 800 songs, many remain unrecorded.

Song (date), Writers - Artist

0-9

A
A Little Bit Of Love (Goes A Long, Long Way) (1992), Kostas/Marty Stuart - Wynonna Judd
Ain't Found Nobody (1994), Harlan Howard/Kostas - The Mavericks
Ain't That Lonely Yet (1993), Kostas/James House - Dwight Yoakam
Ain't That Love (1996) - Kenny Chesney

B
Baby It's You (1994), Dave Goodwin/Howard/Kostas - Hank Flamingo
Baby Take a Piece of My Heart (1991), Kostas/Kelly Willis - Kelly Willis
Ball and Chain (1980) - Kostas Lazarides
Because You Love Me (1998), Kostas/John Scott Sherrill - Jo Dee Messina
Blame It on Your Heart (1993), Howard/Kostas - Patty Loveless

C
Call Me (1995) - Candye Kane
Can't Stop Myself from Loving You (1991) - Patty Loveless
Child With no Home (1980) - Kostas Lazarides

D
Don't Leave Her Lonely Too Long (1989), Kostas/Marty Stuart - Marty Stuart
Don't Need That Heartache (1995), Kostas/Melba Montgomery - Tracy Byrd
Don't Start a Fire (If You Can't Put It Out) (1997), Dean Folkvord/Kostas - Kostas
Don't Threaten Me with a Good Time (1996), Bobby Boyd/Kostas/Don Mealer - Billy Dean
Down on the River (1990), Kostas/Wayland Patton - Neal McCoy
Dream River (1998), Kostas/Raul Malo - The Mavericks

E
Everything About You (1991), Harry Stinson/Kostas - George Fox

F
Feelings of Love (1990) - Patty Loveless
Feels Like Mississippi (1997), Pete Anderson/Kostas - Pete Anderson
Fools Like Me (1991), Hal Ketchum/Kostas - Trisha Yearwood
Full Deck of Cards (1996), Kostas/Melanie Dyer - Rick Trevino

G
Geisha Girl (1980) - Kostas Lazarides
Girls go fishin’ - co-written by Kostas Lazarides and Neil Diamond 
Going Out of My Mind (1992), Kostas/Terry McBride - McBride & the Ride
Good Mornin' Memory (1994), Kostas/Greg Lucas - Kostas

H
Half a Heart (1991), Kostas/Marty Stuart - Marty Stuart
Happiness (2005) - Lee Ann Womack
Harbor for a Lonely Heart (1991), Kostas/Jenny Yates - Sammy Kershaw
Heart Full of Love - Holly Dunn
Heart of Stone (1995), Dwight Yoakam/Kostas - Dwight Yoakam
The Heart That Love Forgot (1991), Kostas/Mas Palermo - Kelly Willis
Heartaches and Dreams (1997), George Ducas/Kostas - George Ducas
Here Comes Temptation (1993) - Trisha Yearwood
Here Comes the Rain - The Mavericks
High on Love - Patty Loveless
Honky Tonk Girls (1999) - Hank Williams III

I
I Can Love You Better (1997) - The Chicks
I Come and Go (1980) - Kostas Lazarides
I Don't Believe That's How You Feel (1996), Kostas/Harlan Howard - Tracy Byrd
I Never Saw Paris (1994), John Scott Sherrill/Kostas - Kostas Lazarides
I Want a Woman (1991), Kostas/Marty Stuart - Marty Stuart
I'll Just Pretend (1996), Richard Bennett/Kostas - Mandy Barnett
I'm Goin' Up (1997), Kostas/Wally Wilson - Claire Lynch
I'm Still Falling (2003) - Slow Horses
If You Only Knew (1995), Kostas/Raul Malo - The Mavericks
If You Think (1988) - Patty Loveless
In His World (1990) - Kostas/Leigh Reynolds - Emmylou Harris
Is It Love Yet (1997) - Kostas/Chely Wright - Chely Wright
It Only Hurts When I Laugh (1994) Kostas/Marty Stuart - Rick Trevino
It's About Me (1997) - John Bettis/Kostas - Joy Lynn White

J
Jane (1966) - Kostas Lazarides
Just a Memory (1994), Kostas/Raul Malo - The Mavericks

K
King of Fools (1993), Dwight Yoakam/Kostas - Dwight Yoakam

L
Language of Love (1995), Bobby Carmichael/Kostas - Lisa Brokop
Lies Like Hell (2014), Bobby Boyd/Kostas - Point Blank
Life #9 (1993), Kostas/Tony Perez - Martina McBride
A Little Bit of Love (Goes a Long, Long Way) (1992), Kostas/Marty Stuart - Wynonna
The Lonely Side of Love (1988) - Patty Loveless
Looking in the Eyes of Love (1990), Kostas/Tricia Walker - Patty Loveless
Lord Have Mercy on the Working Man (1992) - Travis Tritt
Love Can Die (1980) - Kostas Lazarides
Love Don't Care (1999), Kostas/Anders Osborne - Anders Osborne
Love Fever (2001), Kevin Bowe/Kostas - Ana Popovic
Love on the Loose, Heart on the Run (1993), Kostas/Anna Lisa Graham - McBride & the Ride

M
Mind Over Matter (1995), Kostas/Wally Wilson - Stacy Dean Campbell
More Of Your Love (2001), Kostas/Wally Wilson - The Derailers

N
Neon Blue (1994), Pete Anderson/Kostas - The Mavericks
Next Time I Fall in Love (2007),  Kostas/Trent Summar/John Bohlinger - Ashley Ray
No Rainbows (1980) - Kostas Lazarides
Nobody Loves You Like I Do (1991) - Patty Loveless
Nothin' But Good (1994), Kostas/William Soule Robinson - Dawn Sears
Nothing (1995), Dwight Yoakam/Kostas - Dwight Yoakam
Nothing's Changed Here (1990), Dwight Yoakam/Kostas - Dwight Yoakam
Now That's All Right with Me, Kostas/Tony Perez - (1996) Mandy Barnett, (2008) Jypsi, (1996) Chris LeDoux

O
On Down the Line (1990) - Patty Loveless
Out of Control Raging Fire - Patty Loveless with Travis Tritt
On the 7th Day (2003) - Etta James
One of You (1999) (Kostas, Jim Lauderdale) - George Strait on the Always Never the Same album.
The One That Got Away (Got Away With My Heart) (1998) - Allison Moorer
One Way Rider (1995), Kostas/Kevin Welch - Kevin Welch
Overtime (1990) - Patty Loveless

P
Pizziricco (1999), Kostas/Raul Malo - The Mavericks
Pretend (1994), Kostas/Raul Malo - The Mavericks

R
The Richest Fool Alive (2001), Bobby Boyd/Kostas/Donald Mealer - Patty Loveless
Ridin' the Rodeo (1991) – Vince Gill, (1995) - Perfect Stranger
Ring (2005) - Gary Allan
Rainy Days (1996) - Mandy Barnett - Kostas/Pamela Brown Hayes

S
Send a Message to My Heart - Dwight Yoakam with Patty Loveless
She Ain't My Baby Anymore - "Kostas/John Bohlinger (musician)" - Kostas
She's So Lonely (1996), Kostas/Dean Miller - Scott Joss
Shelter from the Storm (1996), Kostas/Marty Stuart - Marty Stuart
Slave to the Habit (1999) - Kostas/Toby Keith/Chuck Cannon – Shane Minor
Souvenirs (1996), Kostas/Kevin Welch - Scott Joss
Starlight (1980) - Kostas Lazarides
Sweet Miss Behavin' (1994), Kostas/Wally Wilson - Collin Raye

T
Tenderly So (1980) - Kostas Lazarides
That Something In My Life (1997), Clint Black/Kostas - Clint Black
That's All Right With Me (1993), Kostas/Tony Perez - Ronna Reeves
That's What I'm Gonna Do (1994), Jodie Decker, Kostas - Kostas Lazarides
There Goes My Heart (1994), Kostas/Malo - The Mavericks
This Time (1993), Yoakam/Kostas - Dwight Yoakam
Timber, I'm Falling in Love (1988) - Patty Loveless
True Confessions (1992), Kostas/Marty Stuart - Joy Lynn White
Try Not to Look So Pretty (1993), Yoakam/Kostas - Dwight Yoakam
Turn It On, Turn It Up, Turn Me Loose (1990), Kostas/Patton - Dwight Yoakam
Two Doors Down (1993), Yoakam/Kostas - Dwight Yoakam
Two Timin' Two Stepper (1993), Bobby Boyd/Kostas - Conway Twitty

W
Walkin' In The Sunshine (1999), Jeff Hanna/Kostas - Farmer's Daughter
What a Crying Shame (1994), Kostas/Raul Malo - The Mavericks
What Did Love Ever Do To You (1999), Dean Miller/Kostas - Hank Williams III
What We Do (1980) - Kostas Lazarides
Who's Gonna Pay for This Broken Heart (1996), Kostas/Lee Roy Parnell - The Cox Family
Would You Believe Me If I Lied (1997), Kostas/Billy Yates - Billy Yates

Y
You and Only You (1998), Kostas/Wally Wilson - Mila Mason
You Beat All I've Ever Seen (1996), Kostas/Kathy Louvin/Melba Montgomery - Rhonda Vincent
You Can't Stop Love (1996) - Marty Stuart
Young Hearts Rockin' to a Country Beat (1997), Kostas/Tim Ryan Rouillier - Dallas County Line
Your Tattoo (1995), Kostas/Jack Tempchin - Sammy Kershaw

Lists of songs by songwriters